Starcade may refer to:

Starcade, a video arcade game show (1982-83)
Starcade (Disneyland), a video arcade attraction at Disneyland Park in Anaheim
Starcade (TV block), a Saturday Morning programming block on CBS
JonTron's StarCade, a Star Wars-centric spin-off of the webseries JonTron

See also
Starrcade, the professional wrestling event
WCW/New Japan Supershow, the professional wrestling event also promoted in Japan as "Starrcade"